Krzysztof Arciszewski (9 December 1592 in Rogalin – 7 April 1656 near Gdańsk (Danzig), Poland) was a Polish nobleman, military officer, engineer, and ethnographer. Arciszewski also served as a general of artillery for the Netherlands and Poland.

He was brought up in a family of devout members of the Polish Brethren Church - his father was a pastor, and his cousin was the celebrated theologian Jonasz Szlichtyng. As a young man he served under Krzysztof Radziwiłł. After murdering Kacper Jaruzel Brzeźnicki, he was condemned to infamy and exile, and left Poland in 1623. He went to the Netherlands where he settled in the Hague. There he converted to Calvinism. Thanks to support of Krzysztof Radziwiłł he was able to study artillery, military engineering and navigation at Leiden University. In 1637 he became a vice-governor of Dutch Brazil and head chief of Dutch military forces in that country.

In 1646 he returned to Poland, where he became General of the Artillery.

See also 
Kazimierz Siemienowicz

Sources 
 Krzysztof Arciszewski in :pl:Tygodnik Ilustrowany 1859-10-03, pp. 17–18 p. 17 & p. 18
 Arciszewski, Krzysztof in :pl:S. Orgelbranda Encyklopedia Powszechna (1898) v. 1, pp. 415-416

1592 births
1656 deaths
People from Poznań County
Polish engineers
16th-century Polish nobility
Polish Calvinist and Reformed Christians
Polish generals in other armies
Generals of the Polish–Lithuanian Commonwealth
People of Dutch Brazil
Royal Netherlands Army personnel
Leiden University alumni
17th-century Polish nobility
17th-century Polish military personnel